"I Don't Wanna Know" is a song by American R&B artist Mario Winans featuring rapper P. Diddy and re-recorded background vocals by Enya. The song is based on a sample of the Fugees' song "Ready or Not", which in turn samples the synthesizer riff from Enya's song "Boadicea", as well as the beat from EPMD's song "You're a Customer".

Released on February 17, 2004, "I Don't Wanna Know" spent eight consecutive weeks at number two on the US Billboard Hot 100, behind the Usher singles "Yeah!" and "Burn", respectively, and reached number one in Germany, the Netherlands, and the United Kingdom. It became a top-10 hit in many other countries, including Australia, Canada, France, Ireland, and New Zealand, and has received multiple sales certifications.

In 2022, record producer Metro Boomin, singer The Weeknd, and rapper 21 Savage released the single "Creepin'", which is a partial cover of the song with lyrics sung by The Weeknd, added with a new rap verse from 21 Savage instead of P. Diddy, who would later join the artists on a remix of the song in 2023.

Composition
The song is sung over a background track that samples the Fugees' 1996 hit single "Ready or Not", which itself was based on a slowed-down sample of the instrumental track "Boadicea" by Enya from her 1987 album, Enya. Winans said: "I first heard 'Boadicea' at the end of the movie Sleepwalkers about five or six years ago. It's something I always wanted to produce. Then when The Fugees did it, oh my God, I loved it."

Critical reception
Vibe wrote that "Winans adds a simple stuttering beat that prevents the song from devolving into murky, saccharine Muzak. This is the secret of Winan's magic; the soft touch of the synthesizers and his gentle piano playing blend with the signature sound of the kick and snare – hard, unadorned, punching through the music's gauzy elegiac texture."

Commercial performance
"I Don't Wanna Know" peaked at number two on the US Billboard Hot 100 for eight weeks and reached the same position on the Hot R&B/Hip-Hop Singles & Tracks chart. It topped the Billboard Rhythmic chart and also peaked at number four on the Mainstream Top 40 ranking. The song was a radio hit in Canada, reaching number two on Radio & Records CHR/Pop Top 30 chart. Outside North America, the song reached number one on the Eurochart Hot 100, topping the charts of Germany, the Netherlands, and the United Kingdom. Across the rest of Europe, the song became a top-five hit in several regions, including Flanders, France, Ireland, Norway, and Switzerland. In Australasia, "I Don't Wanna Know" peaked at number two in Australia and number three in New Zealand.

Track listings

Australian CD1 and UK CD single
 "I Don't Wanna Know" – 4:17
 "Pretty Girl Bullsh*t" (featuring Foxy Brown) – 4:22
 "I Don't Wanna Know" (instrumental) – 4:17
 "I Don't Wanna Know" (video)

Australian CD2
 "I Don't Wanna Know" – 4:17
 "I Already Know" – 1:54
 "The Game" – 3:57
 "I Don't Wanna Know" (video)

UK 12-inch single
A1. "I Don't Wanna Know" – 4:17
A2. "I Don't Wanna Know" (instrumental) – 4:17
B1. "Pretty Girl Bullsh*t" (featuring Foxy Brown) – 4:29
B2. "Pretty Girl Bullsh*t" (instrumental) – 4:30

UK mini-CD single and European CD single
 "I Don't Wanna Know" – 4:17
 "Pretty Girl Bullsh*t" (featuring Foxy Brown) – 4:22

Charts

Weekly charts

Year-end charts

Certifications and sales

Release history

Answer songs

"You Should Really Know"

An answer to "I Don't Wanna Know" sung from a female perspective, "You Should Really Know", was released later the same year as Winans' single, on August 30, 2004. Created by producers the Pirates, it features Shola Ama, Naila Boss, and Ishani, and it uses the same Enya sample as the original. Although it did not achieve the level of success Winans' single did in the US, it was a top-ten hit in the United Kingdom, peaking at number eight on the UK Singles Chart, and it also reached the top 50 in Austria, the Czech Republic, France, Greece, and Ireland.

Charts
Weekly charts

Year-end charts

Others
Later, another answer song called "I Already Know" sung by Noelle was released and had the same background melody as the original song. American R&B group Nina Sky also recorded their own version of their song entitled "Time to Go" featuring rapper Angie Martinez.

References

2004 singles
2004 songs
Answer songs
Bad Boy Records singles
Enya songs
European Hot 100 Singles number-one singles
Number-one singles in Scotland
Relentless Records singles
Sean Combs songs
Songs with lyrics by Roma Ryan
Songs with music by Enya
Songs written by Erick Sermon
Songs written by Loon (rapper)
Songs written by Mario Winans
Songs written by PMD (rapper)
Songs written by Sean Combs
UK Singles Chart number-one singles